"Thats What I Want" is a song by American rapper and singer Lil Nas X, released through Columbia Records on September 18, 2021, as the fourth single from his debut studio album Montero (2021). It is a pop rock song with elements of power pop, while the artist is singing about wanting love. It was written by Lil Nas X and the song's producers, Omer Fedi, Blake Slatkin, Ryan Tedder, and KBeaZy.

It received favorable reviews, with critics comparing it to Outkast's work, especially to their 2003 single "Hey Ya!". The song's release was accompanied by a Stillz-directed music video featuring the rapper falling in love with a football player. It contains a cameo from Billy Porter and an homage to the 2005 film Brokeback Mountain. Lil Nas X performed this song for the first time on BBC Radio 1's Live Lounge. It became a top ten hit in 10 countries, including the United States and the United Kingdom.

Composition
"Thats What I Want" was written by Lil Nas X, and song's producers: Omer Fedi, Blake Slatkin, Ryan Tedder, and KBeaZy. It is a pop rock song backed-up by acoustic guitar, "breezy" rhythm, "acoustic strums and hand claps and raindrop-bloopy synth notes." The song was compared by the critics to Outkast's "Hey Ya!" (2003), Taylor Swift's "Shake It Off" (2014) and the Kid Laroi and Justin Bieber's "Stay" (2021). The track begins with the rapper stating "Need a boy who can cuddle with me all night." The song's chorus is accompanied by "power pop" background choir and it sees Lil Nas X singing that he wants to have a lover.

Release and promotion
Lil Nas X first previewed the song on TikTok on February 14, 2021. On August 26, 2021, Lil Nas X published another Montero announcement in a form of news, with "Thats What I Want" playing in the background. Hours before the album's release, the rapper uploaded a video on his YouTube channel entitled The Montero Show, where he presents his music videos from the least to the most favorite, but when he is about to announce the "Thats What I Want" video his water breaks. Deryck Whibley and Jason McCaslin talks about the Underclass Hero single of the song from the video. With the album's release, the song has been announced as its fourth single. On the same day it received airplay premiere on Australian mainstream radio station The Music Network and British BBC Radio 1. It impacted pop radios in Italy and the United States on September 24 and 28 respectively. Later it was sent to the US rhythmic contemporary stations on October 5. He debuted this song live on September 22, 2021, for BBC Radio 1's Live Lounge.

Critical reception
Carl Wilson from Slate stated that "Thats What I Want" is a "fantastic" song and an "anthem of same-sex longing"; while Mike Wass of Variety called it "toe-tapper with massive radio appeal". Its chorus has been described as "indelible" by The Guardians Alexis Petridis, "snappy" by Gil Kaufman of Billboard, and "stirring" in an article published on Entertainment Weekly by Maura Johnston. Calling its beat "infectious", David Smyth of Evening Standard said that Lil Nas X could have made the pronouns ambiguous for "mass appeal", but opposing to that he made the song "[ring] completely true". Writing for Rolling Stone, Jon Dolan assigned to the song adjectives such as "playful", "hopeful", "sweet", and "proud"; while New Statesmans Emily Bootle described it as an "innocent, emotive love song". Zoya Raza-Sheikh from Gay Times said it is a "soaring track packed with unapologetic queer heartache that builds the record's momentum". In an article published by Billboard in late September 2021, the song was described as "designed to be a charts favorite" by Stephen Daw, while Jason Lipshutz said that it "functions as a spiritual sequel to 'Montero (Call Me by Your Name)' (2021)".

Commercial performance
"Thats What I Want" debuted at number 10 on Billboard Hot 100 on the chart issued October 2, 2021, giving Lil Nas X his third top ten debut and fifth top ten hit. It later peaked at number eight on the chart issued April 2, 2022. It charted within the top ten with the album's previous singles "Montero (Call Me by Your Name)" and "Industry Baby", giving the rapper his first time where three of his songs were simultaneously within top ten. It also appeared at number 5 on Streaming Songs chart with 24.2 million streams. Additionally, "Thats What I Want" debuted on the Mainstream Top 40 chart at number 34 and reached number one on the chart dated February 19, 2022, becoming Lil Nas X's third consecutive number one single on the chart. The song also went on to become his first multi-week chart topper on the Pop Airplay chart, retaining the top spot for 4 non-consecutive weeks.

It also debuted on Billboards global charts, at number 4 on the main chart, while logging at number 8 on Excluding US chart with 39.6 million streams from outside the US. 

Elsewhere, "Thats What I Want" became highest debut in UK Singles Chart on chart issue September 30, 2021, logging at number 10. It was also placed at number 7 on ARIA Singles Chart.

Music video

The music video for "Thats What I Want" was directed by STILLZ and produced by Esteban Zuluaga, Malcolm Duncan, and Fabien Colas which premiered on September 18, 2021. During a football game at the fictional Montero University, whose players wear pink uniforms, Lil Nas X falls from the sky to crash on the field, causing him to injure his knee. As he is taken off the field, he meets the eyes of another player, played by Yai Ariza. The two of them meet alone in the locker room, where they begin to kiss. Later they are seen in a passionate sex scene in the shower, with Lil Nas X opening a Durex condom package.

In the second verse, the pair are seen next to a campfire in cowboy outfits as well as being intimate in a tent; the scene is a homage to Brokeback Mountain (2005). Next, Lil Nas X goes to the other man's house with flowers, only to discover he is married to a woman and has a child. Lil Nas X drives home in anguish, gets drunk, and eventually passes out. At the end of the video, Lil Nas X enters a church wearing a white wedding gown and walks down the aisle in tears. At the altar a priest, played by Billy Porter, gives him an electric guitar, on which Lil Nas X plays a solo.

Kaufman described the video as "steamy, drama-filled", adding that it is "fittingly high drama visual for an album that has already given us some other iconic videos for 'Industry Baby' and 'Montero (Call Me by Your Name)'." Writing for The Fader, Shaad D'Souza described it as "raunchy" and "cinematic". Wilson said that it is "tour de force performance of in-your-face queerness".

Charts

Weekly charts

Year-end charts

Certifications

Release history

References

2021 singles
2021 songs
Lil Nas X songs
Columbia Records singles
LGBT-related songs
American pop rock songs
Songs about loneliness
Song recordings produced by KBeaZy
Song recordings produced by Omer Fedi
Song recordings produced by Ryan Tedder
Songs written by Lil Nas X
Songs written by Omer Fedi
Songs written by Ryan Tedder
Songs written by KBeaZy